Siebe Vandermeulen (born 2 January 2001) is a Belgian footballer who plays as a right-back for Zébra Élites Charleroi.

Club career
On 5 August 2022, Vandermeulen signed with Sporting Charleroi and was assigned to their Under-23 squad, Zébra Élites Charleroi.

Career statistics

Club

Notes

References

2001 births
Living people
Belgian footballers
Belgium youth international footballers
Belgian expatriate footballers
Association football defenders
Oud-Heverlee Leuven players
K.R.C. Genk players
SC Telstar players
Eerste Divisie players
Belgian expatriate sportspeople in the Netherlands
Expatriate footballers in the Netherlands
People from Tienen
Footballers from Flemish Brabant